Muhammad Raza Haroon (born 4 October 1965) is a Pakistani politician who was senior leader of Muttahida Qaumi Movement (MQM) until he joined Pak Sarzameen Party in March 2016. He then left PSP.

Early life
Raza did his B Com from Karachi University and BSc in computers from a foreign private university in Karachi.

Political career
Raza joined Muttahida Qaumi Movement in 1987 and moved to London in 1994 after Operation Clean-up begun. In 2007, he returned to Pakistan and was elected a member of Sindh Assembly on a ticket of Muttahida Qaumi Movement from PS-115 (Karachi) in 2008 general elections and served as provincial minister of Sindh for information and technology in 2009.

In March 2016, he left Muttahida Qaumi Movement to join Mustafa Kamal's Pak Sarzameen Party. He then revealed he left PSP.

References

1965 births
Living people
Politicians from Karachi
University of Karachi alumni
Pakistani expatriates in the United Kingdom
Sindh MPAs 2008–2013
Provincial ministers of Sindh